Juan Rasmijn (born February 8, 1981) is an Aruban football player and former player for the Aruba national team.

References

1981 births
Living people
Aruban footballers
Association football forwards
Aruba international footballers